William, Willie, or Billy Haynes may refer to:

 William E. Haynes (1829–1914), United States Representative for Ohio
 William S. Haynes (1864–1939), American silversmith and flute maker
 William Haynes (swimmer), British swimmer
 Willie Haynes (1901–1981), American baseball player
 William Joseph Haynes Jr. (born 1949), United States federal judge
 Billy Jack Haynes (born 1953), American professional wrestler
 William J. Haynes II (born 1958), American lawyer, General Counsel of the U.S. Department of Defense
 William Haynes (comedian) (born 1993), comedian and internet personality